Zagorje is a village in the Municipality of Pivka in the Inner Carniola region of Slovenia.

The parish church in the settlement is dedicated to Saint Helena and belongs to the Koper Diocese. The chapel at the cemetery, north of the settlement, is dedicated to Saint Paul.

References

External links

Zagorje on Geopedia

Populated places in the Municipality of Pivka